Kārlis Muižnieks (born March 17, 1964 in Riga, Latvian SSR, Soviet Union) is a former basketball player and currently is the head coach of Prometey Kamianske of the UA SuperLeague.

Career in basketball
Muižnieks had solid career as player, which is followed by prolific coaching career. As head coach Muižnieks has led his teams to multiple championships, winning titles in domestic and international competitions. So far he has been most successful in Latvia, where he has guided his teams to six Latvian League titles (2002, 2003, 2004, 2005, 2006, 2008). First success in European club tournaments Muižnieks had with BK Ventspils, where in 2002/2003 his squad he finished third in FIBA Europe Champions Cup, where in bronze medal game they upset KK Hemofarm and their up-and-coming star Darko Milicic. Later, in 2004/2005, Muižnieks led Ventspils to ULEB Cup quarterfinals in 2004/2005. Few years later in 2007/2008, his Barons/LMT won FIBA EuroCup title.

In 2011/2012, as coach of Polish side Trefl Sopot, he was named as the Coach of the Year in Poland. Under coach Muižnieks Trefl Sopot won Polish Cup and for the first time made league finals, where they lost only in Game 7 to Asseco Prokom. Success under Muižnieks in Polish league clinched EuroCup berth for Trefl Sopot.

In summer 2012, Muižnieks moved to Ukraine and joined BC Khimik. Muižnieks' squad had a strong season as Khimik made Eurocup quarterfinals for the first time in club history and reached finals of Ukrainian League. On May 6, 2015, Muižnieks finished season with Ukrainian championship and perfect record for Khimik, 36–0.

Muižnieks was also Latvian National Team head coach from 2004 to 2008.

Trivia
He is the nephew of Latvian basketball legend Valdis Muižnieks.

References

1964 births
Living people
BK VEF Rīga players
BK Ventspils players
Latvian men's basketball players
Basketball players from Riga
Latvian basketball coaches
Maccabi Haifa B.C. players
Latvian sports coaches
SC Prometey coaches